Viktoria Pinther (born 16 October 1998) is an Austrian footballer who plays as a forward for Bayer Leverkusen in the Frauen Bundesliga. Pinther was part of the squad that represented Austria at the UEFA Women's Euro 2017, where the team reached the semi-finals.

References

External links
 
 
 

1998 births
Living people
Austria women's international footballers
Austrian women's footballers
Women's association football forwards
SC Sand players
Frauen-Bundesliga players
ÖFB-Frauenliga players
FSK St. Pölten-Spratzern players
UEFA Women's Euro 2017 players
Austrian expatriate women's footballers
Austrian expatriate sportspeople in Germany
Expatriate women's footballers in Germany
Footballers from Vienna